Kirkland Lake Gold Inc. was a Canadian gold mining company, based in Toronto, that owned and operated several gold mines in Canada and Australia. It was founded in 1988 as Goldpac Investments, and then operated as Brimstone Gold Corp. between 1994 and 1999, as a consulting and investment company in the gold mining industry. The company was re-named Foxpoint Resources Ltd. as it sought to acquire and develop its own gold mining property.  In 2001, the Vancouver-based Foxpoint Resources purchased several mining properties from the Kinross Gold around Kirkland Lake, Ontario. The $5 million purchase included several former mines: Macassa Mine, Lakeshore Mine, Wright Hargreaves and Teck Hughes. The company re-named itself again as Kirkland Lake Gold and re-commissioned the underground Macassa Mine. As it continued new exploration, it was able to begin extracting gold from the mine in 2003. Kirkland Lake Gold focused on developing its Macassa mine until 2015 when it acquired St. Andrew Goldfields with its three mines (Holt Complex) about 100 km from Kirkland Lake, in an all-stock deal worth $178 million. Pressure from activist shareholders seeking more aggressive expansion led to changes in management to expand the company's holdings. Later that year, the company acquired Vancouver-based Newmarket Gold Inc., which owned the Cosmo mine in the Northern Territory and the Fosterville and Stawell Gold Mines in Victoria, Australia, for $1.01-billion in stock. Kirkland Lake Gold listed stocks on the Australian Securities Exchange effective November 30, 2017. On the Toronto Stock Exchange, Kirkland Lake Gold was promoted to the S&P/TSX 60 index effective September 23, 2019. Within a few months, the company acquired Detour Gold in a $4.9-billion purchase.

In February 2022, Kirkland Lake Gold merged with Agnico Eagle Mines Limited in an all-stock deal with Kirkland's stocks being delisted.

See also
Largest gold companies
Abitibi gold belt

References

2022 mergers and acquisitions
Companies based in Toronto
Companies formerly listed on the Australian Securities Exchange
Companies formerly listed on the New York Stock Exchange
Companies formerly listed on the Toronto Stock Exchange
Gold mining companies of Canada